"Der Tag" was episode 17 in the fourth season of the TV series M*A*S*H. The 89th episode overall, it first aired in the United States on January 6, 1976.

Plot synopsis
With Margaret away in Tokyo, Frank is getting on everyone's nerves even more than usual. Colonel Potter asks the rest of the senior staff to be more friendly to Frank in hopes of loosening him up. They invite him to a poker game in the Swamp, where he wins hand after hand and gets extremely drunk; later, he passes out in the officers' club and B.J. and Hawkeye have to carry him back to the Swamp. The two play a drunken practical joke on Frank by putting a toe-tag on him that reads "emotionally exhausted and morally bankrupt" before passing out. That night, Frank stumbles out to the latrine, but collapses in the back of a parked ambulance before he can return to the Swamp.

The next day, Potter gets a call from a battalion aid station officer (Joe Morton) where Frank has ended up. He is still unconscious, and since the station is shorthanded, Potter sends a hung-over B.J. and Hawkeye to pick him up. Shortly after they depart, word comes in that the area around the aid station is being shelled; the two doctors arrive at the height of the bombardment and help with a round of emergency surgery before taking Frank back to the 4077th. Just after they return to the Swamp and pass out on their cots from exhaustion, Frank wakes up and tries to continue spreading the good cheer from the previous night, unaware of his trip to and from the aid station. He resumes his annoying behavior, but Margaret's return quickly brings him and life in the camp back to normal.

Trivia
At the start of this episode, Radar is seen reading a copy of the Avengers comic book, which was first published by Marvel in 1963. Additionally, the issue itself switches from #72 (originally published January 1970) to issue #60 (originally published January 1969).

External links
 

M*A*S*H (season 4) episodes
1976 American television episodes